Alma is a 2017 novel authored by J. M. G. Le Clézio. The narrator, Jeremie Falsen, travels to Mauritius to investigate his family's ties to slavery.

References

2017 French novels
Novels about slavery
Novels set in Mauritius
Éditions Gallimard books